Leafield Technical Centre is a former radio transmission station, now turned motorsports centre of excellence, located in the hamlet of Langley, in the western part of the village of Leafield in Oxfordshire, England.

Developed from 1912 as a radio transmission station by the General Post Office, it was decommissioned by successor company British Telecom in 1986. BT Group redeveloped the site as a training college, but then closed the site in 1993.

Sold to a commercial property company, the site was then leased by Tom Walkinshaw Racing (TWR) as a motorsport development centre for the Arrows Formula One team, until the team's demise in the 2002 season. Leafield Technical Centre later became the headquarters of the Super Aguri F1 team, following the team's formation ahead of the 2006 season. Super Aguri remained at the site until folding during the 2008 season.

From 2003, Motorsport powertrain specialist Menard Competition Technologies Ltd. also maintained offices and workshops at the site. Throughout the late half of the decade to 2010, this engineering company (including some key engineers from the engine department of Tom Walkinshaw Racing) traded from Leafield and also a second site housing engine dynamometers at Kidlington. They completed design / build engine projects including the V12 engine for Superleague Formula, and engines for Norton Motorcycles' range of Commando 961 models from 2009. UK companies house records for MCT show that the company traded actively until 2011, when owner John Menard ceased to require an audit of the accounts. They also show the company was finally dissolved on 13 May 2014.

In January 2012, it was announced that the Caterham F1 team would be moving to the vacant Leafield from their original base at Hingham, Norfolk and 8 months later, Caterham F1 Team eventually completed their relocation to Leafield Technical Centre. After Caterham declared bankruptcy in early 2015, Leafield Technical Centre was abandoned and put up for sale. In early 2020, it was reported that the site was heavily vandalised during the five-year period of abandonment.

References

External links
Corporate website

Buildings and structures in Oxfordshire
British Telecom buildings and structures
Research institutes in Oxfordshire
West Oxfordshire District